The 1964 French Grand Prix (formally the 50e Grand Prix de l'A.C.F.) was a Formula One motor race held on 28 June 1964 at the Rouen-Les-Essarts circuit, Rouen, France. It was race 4 of 10 in both the 1964 World Championship of Drivers and the 1964 International Cup for Formula One Manufacturers.

The 57-lap race was won by Dan Gurney, driving a works Brabham-Climax, after starting from second position. Graham Hill finished second in a BRM, having started sixth, with Jack Brabham third in the other works Brabham-Climax.

Classification

Qualifying

Race

Championship standings after the race 

Drivers' Championship standings

Constructors' Championship standings

References

External links 
 1964 French Grand Prix at grandprix.com
 1964 French Grand Prix at statsf1.com

French Grand Prix
French Grand Prix
1964 in French motorsport